MotionSports is a sports video game released for the Xbox 360 in November 2010 by Ubisoft. It was one of the first games released for use with the Kinect motion sensing device.

Reception

The game received "unfavorable" reviews according to the review aggregation website Metacritic.

References

External links
 

2010 video games
Kinect games
Sports video games
Ubisoft games
Video games developed in Italy
Xbox 360 games
Xbox 360-only games